Onur Ünlü (born 24 June 1973) is a Turkish film director, screenwriter, poet and actor.

Filmography

Awards
 Golden Orange Award for Best Screenplay (2009)
 Golden Orange Award for Best Screenplay (2014)

References

External links
 

1973 births
Living people
People from İzmit
Turkish film directors
Turkish male film actors
Turkish male screenwriters